Kevin McCloud's Man Made Home is a British television series, broadcast on Channel 4. The series features Kevin McCloud's attempt at building a sustainable eco-friendly shed in the woods. In order to achieve this, he decided to use only the materials locally available in the woodland where the shed was to be built, or to employ only recycled materials. Series 1 aired on 23 September 2012 and finished four weeks later on 13 October 2012.

The shed that was successfully produced during the first series, was transportable to avoid the need for planning permissions. Thus in the second series, McCloud decided to relocate the shed to Watchet, on the coast of Somerset where he expanded it, employing a nautical theme to match its location overlooking the sea. The second series aired approximately one year after the first, on 22 September 2013. It finished on 13 October 2013.

A third series of the show has been rumoured, but unconfirmed.

Episode List

Series 1 (2012)

Series 2 (2013)

References

External links
 Kevin McCloud's Man Made Home at Channel 4

Channel 4 reality television shows
Television series by All3Media
Television series by Optomen